Isabelle Foerder (born 7 July 1979) is a paralympic athlete from Germany, competing mainly in category T37 sprint events.

Biography
Isabelle Foerder competed in four consecutive paralympics games, starting in 1996.  These were the only games where she competed in long; every other time, including 1996, she competed in the 100m and 200m.  She has had most success in the 100m w,inning silver in 1996, 2000 and 2004, while she has also won a silver (1996) and bronze (2004) in the 200m.

References

External links
 
 

1979 births
Living people
German female sprinters
Paralympic athletes of Germany
Paralympic silver medalists for Germany
Paralympic bronze medalists for Germany
Paralympic medalists in athletics (track and field)
Athletes (track and field) at the 1996 Summer Paralympics
Athletes (track and field) at the 2000 Summer Paralympics
Athletes (track and field) at the 2004 Summer Paralympics
Athletes (track and field) at the 2008 Summer Paralympics
Athletes (track and field) at the 2012 Summer Paralympics
Athletes (track and field) at the 2020 Summer Paralympics
Medalists at the 1996 Summer Paralympics
Medalists at the 2000 Summer Paralympics
Medalists at the 2004 Summer Paralympics